Iresia is a genus of beetles in the family Cicindelidae, containing the following species:

 Iresia aureorufa W. Horn, 1909
 Iresia besckii Mannerheim, 1837
 Iresia bimaculata Klug, 1834
 Iresia binotata Klug, 1834
 Iresia boucardii Chevrolat, 1863
 Iresia egregia Chaudoir, 1860
 Iresia lacordairei Dejean, 1831
 Iresia latens Sumlin, 1994
 Iresia mniszechii Chaudoir, 1862
 Iresia opalescens Sumlin, 1999
 Iresia phaedra Sumlin, 1999
 Iresia psyche Sumlin, 1994
 Iresia pulchra Bates, 1881
 Iresia surinamensis Chaudoir, 1862

References

Cicindelidae